The province of West Papua in Indonesia is divided into regencies. The regencies are turn are divided administratively into districts, also known in Indonesian as distrik or kecamatan.

List
The districts of West Papua and their respective regencies are as follows (as of December 2019). Administrative villages (kampung) are also listed for each district.

See also
List of districts of Papua
List of ethnic groups of West Papua

References

Districts of West Papua
West Papua